Trox gemmulatus is a beetle of the family Trogidae.

References

gemmulatus
Beetles described in 1874
Taxa named by George Henry Horn